The Sten was a family of British submachine guns.

Sten may also refer to:

 Sten (name)
 Sten (book), the first book in The Sten Chronicles by Chris Bunch and Allan Cole
 Sten scores, a psychometric instrument scale
 A brand name of testosterone propionate/testosterone cypionate/prasterone, an injectable mixture of testosterone esters used as a medication

de:Sten